is a former Japanese football player. He played for Japan national team.

Club career
Yokoyama was born in Nagasaki Prefecture on April 10, 1956. After graduating from high school, he joined Japan Soccer League Division 1 club Nippon Steel in 1975. However the club performance was not good, the club was relegated to Division 2 in 1982. He played 105 games and scored 29 goals in Division 1.

National team career
On August 23, 1979, Yokoyama debuted for Japan national team against North Korea. In 1980, he played in all matches included 1980 Summer Olympics qualification and 1982 World Cup qualification. In 1983 and 1984, he also played at 1984 Summer Olympics qualification. This qualification was his last game for Japan. He played 31 games and scored 10 goals for Japan until 1984.

National team statistics

References

External links
 
 Japan National Football Team Database

1956 births
Living people
Association football people from Nagasaki Prefecture
Japanese footballers
Japan international footballers
Japan Soccer League players
Nippon Steel Yawata SC players
Association football forwards